Qasim Abbas Khan is a Pakistani politician who had been a member of the Provincial Assembly of Punjab from October 2018 till January 2023.

Political career
Khan was elected to the Provincial Assembly of Punjab from the constituency PP-222 in 2018 Pakistani by-elections as an independent candidate. He defeated Sohail Ahmed Noon of Pakistan Tehreek-e-Insaf. Khan garnered 38,327 votes while his closest rival secured 31,893 votes.

References

Living people
Politicians from Punjab, Pakistan
Pakistan Tehreek-e-Insaf politicians
Year of birth missing (living people)